Coleophora univittella is a moth of the family Coleophoridae. It is found in Ukraine.

References

univittella
Moths of Europe
Moths described in 1880